Ceres Airport  is a public use airport located 1 nm east-northeast of Ceres, Santa Fe, Argentina.

See also
List of airports in Argentina

References

External links 
 Airport record for Ceres Airport at Landings.com

Airports in Santa Fe Province